ntop is computer software that probes a computer network to show network use in a way similar to what the program top does for processes.

Software
In interactive mode, it displays the network status on the user's terminal. In Web mode, it acts as a web server, creating a HTML dump of the network status. It supports a NetFlow-sFlow emitter-collector, a Hypertext Transfer Protocol (HTTP) based client interface for creating ntop-centric monitoring applications, and RRDtool (RRD) for persistently storing traffic statistics.

ntop is available for both Unix and Win32-based platforms. It has been developed by Luca Deri, an Italian research scientist and network manager at University of Pisa.

Common usage on a Linux system is to start the ntop daemon, then one can use the web interface to ntop via visiting  provided the loopback device has been started and the listening port for ntop is 3000 (look out for the  option in ).

See also
 Netsniff-ng
 iftop
 ntopng

References

External links
 

Network analyzers
Unix network-related software
Linux security software